The eighth Central American and Caribbean Games were held in Caracas, Venezuela, and it was the first time this nation had held the Games. The Games were held from 6 January to 15 January 1959 and included 1,150 athletes from twelve nations, competing in seventeen sports.

Sports

References
 Meta
 

 
Central American and Caribbean Games, 1959
Central American and Caribbean Games
1959 in Caribbean sport
1959 in Venezuelan sport
Central American and Caribbean Games, 1959
Sports competitions in Caracas
1959 in Central American sport
Multi-sport events in Venezuela
20th century in Caracas
January 1959 sports events in North America